James Daniel Stevens is a professional footballer who plays for Essex Senior Football League club Bowers & Pitsea.

Career
Stevens came through Southend United's youth system, making his professional debut on 26 March 2011, starting in their 2–1 away loss to Stockport County in League Two. He was substituted for another debutant, Teddy Nesbitt at half-time.

In August 2011, he joined Isthmian League Division One North club Great Wakering Rovers on loan alongside George Artemi and George Smith.

On 18 May 2012, Stevens was one of eleven players to be released at the end of their contract.

In August 2012, Stevens signed for Isthmian League side Witham Town on a free transfer.

References

External links
Southend United profile

Living people
1992 births
English footballers
Association footballers from Northern Ireland
Southend United F.C. players
Great Wakering Rovers F.C. players
Witham Town F.C. players
Grays Athletic F.C. players
Bowers & Pitsea F.C. players
Isthmian League players
English Football League players
Association football midfielders